Stonehill International School is a private, secular, coeducational day and boarding school for students aged from three to eighteen. English is the medium of instruction throughout.

The school is operated by the Stonehill Education Foundation, within the Embassy Group, and is a non-profit company registered in India under Section 25 of the Companies Act. It operates under a ‘no-objection’ certificate issued by the Karnataka Government Secretariat Education Department. The Governing Council (GC) of the Stonehill Education Foundation (corresponding to ‘The Board’ in many schools) acts with the authority of the Directors of the Stonehill Education Foundation.

The school is accredited by the Council of International Schools (CIS) and by the New England Association of Schools and Colleges (NEASC). It is authorised to offer the International Baccalaureate Primary Years Programme (PYP), the Middle Years Programme (MYP), and the Diploma Programme (DP). Stonehill is a member of the Association of International Schools in India (TAISI), the East Asia Regional Council of Schools (EARCOS), and the Australian Boarding Schools’ Association (ABSA).

The school is located north of Bangalore on the way to Kempegowda International Airport. It is a two-story facility purpose-built on 34 acres of land. A fleet of buses transports students to and from school.

Students at Stonehill come from a wide variety of backgrounds. Some are long-term residents of Bangalore. Others are the children of expatriates who are working in India on fixed-term contracts, and others are the children of Indians who have lived and worked abroad but who have returned to India. At any time, the school has students of more than thirty nationalities.

References
 

International schools in Bangalore
Private schools in Bangalore
Primary schools in Karnataka
High schools and secondary schools in Bangalore
Educational institutions established in 2008
2008 establishments in Karnataka
International schools in India
International Baccalaureate schools in India